Stanislav Valeryevich Yefimov (born 9 August 1993) is a Russian football midfielder who plays for Finnish club EIF.

Club career
Yefimov made his debut in the Russian Second Division for FC Lokomotiv-2 Moscow on 20 April 2013 in a game against FC Rus Saint Petersburg.

He made his Russian Football National League debut for FC Khimki on 6 August 2016 in a game against FC Mordovia Saransk.

On 6 June 2019, Yefimov signed for FC Pyunik. On 2 December 2019, Yefimov left Pyunik by mutual consent.

References

External links
 Career summary by sportbox.ru  
 
 
 
 

1993 births
Living people
Footballers from Moscow
Russian footballers
Association football midfielders
FC Khimki players
FC Lokomotiv Moscow players
Riga FC players
FC Yerevan players
FC Pyunik players
FC Van players
Ekenäs IF players
Russian Second League players
Russian First League players
Armenian Premier League players
Ykkönen players
Russian expatriate footballers
Expatriate footballers in Latvia
Expatriate footballers in Armenia
Expatriate footballers in Finland
Russian expatriate sportspeople in Latvia
Russian expatriate sportspeople in Armenia
Russian expatriate sportspeople in Finland
FC Nosta Novotroitsk players